This is a list of universities in Belgium. In Belgium, which is a federal state, the constitution attributes legislative power over higher education to the Communities. The Dutch-speaking Flemish Community, the French Community and the German Community thus determine which institutes of higher education they organise or recognise, and which diplomas may be legally issued by these institutes.
Below is a list of recognised institutes of higher education in Belgium sorted by the responsible Community.

Institutes of higher education in the Flemish Community

Universities 
Five Flemish universities issue academic bachelor, master and doctoral degrees:
 University of Antwerp, Antwerp
 Vrije Universiteit Brussel, Brussels
 Ghent University, Ghent
 Hasselt University, Hasselt and Diepenbeek
 Katholieke Universiteit Leuven, Leuven

As a result of an international treaty between the Netherlands and Flanders, a co-operation between the Hasselt University (Flanders) and the Maastricht University (the Netherlands) is recognised as the
 Transnational University Limburg, Hasselt

According to the Webometrics Ranking of World Universities and the THES - QS World University Rankings, four Flemish universities (University of Antwerp, Vrije Universiteit Brussel, Ghent University and KU Leuven) are among the top 150 universities in Europe and top 300 universities worldwide.

University colleges 
All recognised Flemish university colleges (hogescholen) are associated with a Flemish university. The following university colleges, which issue professional bachelor, academic bachelor's and master's degrees, are recognised by the Flemish government:

Antwerp University Association: university colleges associated with the University of Antwerp
 Artesis Plantijn Hogeschool Antwerpen (Antwerp), public
 Hogere Zeevaartschool Antwerpen (Antwerp), public
 Karel de Grote-Hogeschool - Katholieke Hogeschool Antwerpen (Antwerp), Catholic

Ghent University Association: university colleges associated with Ghent University
 Arteveldehogeschool (Ghent), Catholic
 Hogeschool Gent (Ghent, Aalst, Melle), public
 Hogeschool West-Vlaanderen (Bruges, Kortrijk), public

University Association Brussels: public university college associated with Vrije Universiteit Brussel
 Erasmushogeschool Brussel (Brussels)

K.U.Leuven Association: catholic university colleges associated with Katholieke Universiteit Leuven

 Odisee (Dilbeek, Aalst, Brussels, Ghent, Sint-Niklaas)
 LUCA School of Arts (Genk, Ghent, Leuven, Brussels)
 Thomas More Kempen (Geel, Lier, Turnhout, Vorselaar)
 Thomas More Mechelen-Antwerpen (Antwerp, Mechelen, Sint-Katelijne-Waver)
 UC Leuven-Limburg (Diepenbeek, Leuven, Genk, Hasselt, Diest)
 Katholieke Hogeschool VIVES (Kortrijk, Bruges, Roeselare, Ostend)

Limburg University and College Association: public university college associated with Hasselt University
Hogeschool PXL (Hasselt, Diepenbeek, Genk)

Registered institutes of higher education 
Finally, the Flemish government has recognised a number of "registered" institutes of higher education, which mostly issue specialised degrees or provide education mainly in a foreign language:

 Antwerp Management School (Antwerp)
College of Europe (Bruges)
 Continental Theological Seminary (Sint-Pieters-Leeuw)
 Evangelical Theological Faculty (Leuven)
 Brussels Faculty for Protestant Theology (Brussels)
 Flanders Business School (Antwerp)
 Prince Leopold Institute of Tropical Medicine (Antwerp)
 Vesalius College (Brussels)
 Vlerick Leuven Gent Management School (Leuven, Ghent)

Institutes of higher education in the French Community 
The French Community distinguishes between universities, colleges (Hautes Écoles) and arts colleges (Écoles supérieures des Arts). A list of all recognised institutes is maintained in the Annuaire de l'enseignement supérieur.

Universities 

 Université de Namur (UNamur), Namur
 Saint-Louis University, Brussels (UCLouvain), Brussels
 Université catholique de Louvain (UCLouvain), Louvain-la-Neuve, Brussels, Mons, Tournai, Charleroi and Namur
 University of Liège (ULiège), Liège, Gembloux and Arlon
 University of Mons (UMons), Mons
 Université libre de Bruxelles (ULB), Brussels
 Faculté universitaire de Théologie Protestante (FUTP), Etterbeek (recognised by both communities, its diplomas are not delivered by the French community)

According to the Academic Ranking of World Universities, two of these universities (Université catholique de Louvain and Université libre de Bruxelles) are among the top 150 universities worldwide.

According to the Webometrics Ranking of World Universities, two of these universities (Université catholique de Louvain and University of Liège) are among the top 150 universities in Europe and top 350 universities worldwide.

University colleges 
 Haute École Francisco Ferrer, Brussels
Haute École Bruxelles-Brabant, Brussels and Nivelles
 Haute École Galilée, Brussels
 Haute École Léonard de Vinci, Brussels
 Haute École Lucia de Brouckère, Brussels
 Haute École Groupe ICHEC - ISC Saint-Louis - ISFSC, Brussels
 Haute École libre de Bruxelles - Ilya Prigogine, Brussels
 École pratique des hautes études commerciales, Brussels and Louvain-la-Neuve
 Haute École Charlemagne, Liège, Huy, Gembloux, Verviers
 Haute École libre Mosane - HELMo, Liège, Huy, Verviers, Theux and Ans
 Haute École de la Ville de Liège, Liège
Haute École de la Province de Liège, Liège, Seraing, Theux, Verviers and Huy
 Haute École Albert Jacquard, Namur and Tamines
 Haute École de la Province de Namur, Namur and Ciney
 Haute École de Namur-Liège-Luxembourg, Namur, Arlon, Bastogne, Marche-en-Famenne, Seraing, Virton
 Haute École Robert Schuman, Arlon, Libramont-Chevigny, Virton
 Haute École Louvain en Hainaut - HELHa, Mons, Louvain-la-Neuve, Braine-le-Compte, La Louvière, Charleroi, Gerpinnes, Leuze-en-Hainaut, Mouscron, and Tournai
 Haute École de la Communauté française en Hainaut, Mons and Tournai
 Haute École Provinciale de Hainaut - Condorcet, Mons, Ath, Saint-Ghislain, Charleroi, Mouscron, Froyennes and Morlanwelz

Arts colleges 
 Académie Royale des Beaux-Arts de Bruxelles - École Supérieure des Arts, Brussels
 Conservatoire Royal de Bruxelles - École Supérieure des Arts, Brussels
 Institut National Supérieur des Arts du Spectacle et des techniques de diffusion (INSAS), Brussels
 École Nationale Supérieure des Arts Visuels de La Cambre, Brussels
 École de Recherche Graphique - École Supérieure des Arts (ERG), Saint-Gilles
 Instituts Saint-Luc de Bruxelles - École Supérieure des Arts, Saint-Gilles
 École Supérieure des Arts du Cirque, Auderghem
 Le 75, Woluwe-Saint-Lambert
 Institut des Arts de Diffusion (IAD), Louvain-la-Neuve
 Royal Conservatory of Liège, Liège
 École Supérieure des Arts de la Ville de Liège, Liège
 École Superieure des Arts Saint-Luc de Liège, Liège
 Institut Supérieur de Musique et de Pédagogie, Namur
 Arts², Mons
 Académie des Beaux-Arts de Tournai
 École Supérieure des Arts Saint-Luc Tournai, Tournai

Institutes of higher education in the German-speaking Community 
A single college is operated by the German-speaking Community of Belgium:

 Autonome Hochschule in der Deutschsprachigen Gemeinschaft, Eupen

Federal institutions 
The school of the Belgian Armes Forces officers is organised by Belgium's Federal Government, and has the status of university:

Royal Military Academy, Brussels

Institutes recognised by foreign countries 
The following institutes are not recognised by the Flemish or French speaking communities, but by a foreign country:
 American University, Brussels Center for European Studies (headquarters: Washington, District of Columbia, United States)
 University of Kent (headquarters: Canterbury, United Kingdom)
 Business University, Brussels (headquarters: San Jose, Costa Rica)

Institutions with external validation 
The following academic institutions offer accredited degree programmes which are externally validated by foreign institutions of higher education and learning: 
 Bhaktivedanta College, Durbuy (degrees externally validated by the University of Chester, UK)
 International School of Protocol and Diplomacy, Brussels (degrees externally awarded by the Universidad Camilo José Cela, Spain)
 United Business Institutes, Brussels (degrees externally validated by Middlesex University, UK)

International rankings
Below are shown the international rankings of the Dutch-speaking and French-speaking universities in Belgium, and the number of times they rank in the top 200 of one of the six prominent global rankings:

Notes:
N.A.: Not Applicable
a Number of times the university is ranked within the top 200 of one of the six global rankings. 
b The university is ranked within the top 150 of all six global rankings. 
c The university is ranked within the top 100 of all six global rankings.

See also 
 Belgian American Educational Foundation (BAEF)
 Education in Belgium
 List of Belgian Nobel laureates
 List of colleges and universities
 List of colleges and universities by country
 List of faculties of law in Belgium
 Universities in Leuven
 Science and technology in Belgium
 University Foundation
 Open access in Belgium

References

External links 
 Belnet, the Belgian national research network for education, research and public services.
 Belgian Science Policy Office

Universities

Belgium
Belgium